The EFL Cup (historically and colloquially referred to as the League Cup), currently known as the Carabao Cup for sponsorship reasons, is an annual knockout competition and major trophy in men's domestic football in England. Organised by the English Football League (EFL), it is open to any club within the top four levels of the English football league system – 92 clubs in total – comprising the top-level Premier League, and the three divisions of the English Football League's own league competition (Championship, League One and League Two).

First held in 1960–61 as the Football League Cup, it is one of the three top-tier domestic football competitions in England alongside the Premier League and FA Cup, although it is arguably of far lower prestige. It concludes in February, long before the other two, which end in May. It was introduced by the league as a response to the increasing popularity of European football, and to also exert power over the FA. It also took advantage of the roll-out of floodlights, allowing the fixtures to be played as midweek evening games. With the renaming of the Football League as the English Football League in 2016, the tournament was rebranded as the EFL Cup from the 2016–17 season onwards.

The tournament is played over seven rounds, with single-leg ties throughout, except for the semi-finals. The final is held at Wembley Stadium, which is the only tie in the competition played at a neutral venue and on a weekend (Sunday). The first two rounds are split into North and South sections, and a system of byes based on league level ensures higher ranked teams enter in later rounds, and to defer the entry of teams still involved in Europe. Winners receive the EFL Cup, of which there have been three designs, the current one also being the original. Winners also qualify for European football. From 1972-1963 through the 2019–20 season, the winners received a place in the UEFA Europa League (formerly the UEFA Cup). From 1966–67 through 1971–72 the winners gained a place in the Inter-Cities Fairs Cup). And starting with the 2020–21 season, the winners earn a place in the UEFA Europa Conference League. Should the winner also qualify for Europe through other means at the end of the season, this place is transferred to the highest-placed Premier League team not already qualified for European competition. The current Cup holders are Manchester United, who defeated Newcastle United 2–0 in the 2023 final to win their sixth League Cup.

Status
Although the League Cup is one of the four domestic trophies attainable by English league teams, it is of far lower prestige than the league title or the FA Cup. League Cup winners receive £100,000 prize money (awarded by the Football League) with the runners-up receiving £50,000, considered relatively insignificant to top-flight teams, compared to the £2 million prize money of the FA Cup, which is in turn eclipsed by the Premier League's television money (awarded on final league position) and consequent participation in the Champions League.

Some clubs have repeatedly fielded a weaker side in the competition, making the opportunity for giant-killing of the larger clubs more likely. Many teams in the Premier League, Arsenal and Manchester United in particular, have used the competition to give young players valuable big-game experience. Consequently, it began to be described sarcastically by many fans as the "Mickey Mouse cup".

However, in 2010, in response to Arsène Wenger's claim that a League Cup win would not end his trophy drought, Alex Ferguson described the trophy as "a pot worth winning". After a period of decline when the competition's future was regularly questioned, recent years have seen a revival in respect for the trophy, as the larger Premier League clubs have come to dominate the competition again, and the development nature of the competition has begun to be viewed as a positive for the clubs involved. Premier League giants Manchester City (6), Manchester United (6), Liverpool (4) and Chelsea (3) between them won 19 editions of the competition between 2000 and 2023.

History
The original idea for a League Cup came from Stanley Rous who saw the competition as a consolation for clubs who had already been knocked out of the FA Cup. However, it was not Rous who came to implement it, but Football League Secretary Alan Hardaker. Hardaker initially proposed the competition as a way for the clubs to make up on lost revenue, due to a reduction in matches played, for when the league was to be re-organised. The re-organisation of the league was not immediately forthcoming; however, the cup competition was introduced regardless.

The trophy was paid for personally by Football League President Joe Richards, who was proud of the competition and he had his own name engraved on it. Richards described the competition's formation as an "interim step" on the way to the league's re-organisation. Richards' priority was the re-organisation of the leagues, "perhaps by cutting down the number of clubs in each division, as has already been suggested, and even given more consideration to the system of four up and four down".

Hardaker felt that the Football League needed to adapt to the times, as the English game was losing prestige. He felt that the Football League should take the lead in revitalising football in the nation: "It must be obvious to all of you that the time has come to do something, and it is up to the Football League to give the lead. I hope the Press will not immediately assume that the League is going to fall out with the F.A. or anybody else... the time has come for our voice to be heard in every problem which affects the professional game."

The League Cup competition was established at a time when match day attendances were dwindling. The league had lost a million spectators compared to the previous season. It was established at a time when tensions between the Football League and the Football Association were high. The biggest disagreement was about how revenue was shared between the clubs.

During the late 1950s, the majority of senior English clubs equipped their grounds with floodlights. This opened up the opportunity to exploit weekday evenings throughout the winter. The League Cup was introduced in the 1960–61 season specifically as a mid-week floodlit tournament, to replace the Southern Professional Floodlit Cup.

The League Cup was criticised by the better-endowed clubs. The Times correspondent at the time felt that the League Cup was a step in the wrong direction; the European Cup had been formed five years prior to the League Cup and the correspondent felt the League Cup's introduction was adding to existing problems. The Times published on 30 May 1960: "Where a drastic reduction is required in an attempt to raise quality, no doubt quantity and a further spread of mediocrity will be the dose. Where men like Count Bernabeu with his wider horizons, think in terms of a European League for the future in which a lead could surely now be given jointly by our leaders, the Football League propose next season to implement their useless Football League Cup to be played in midweek. It gets the players, the clubs and the public nowhere."

Aston Villa were the inaugural winners in 1960–61, defeating Rotherham United 3–2 in the final over two legs. Football in England was considered to be of a low quality, compared to what was being played on the continent, as relatively unfashionable clubs Burnley and Wolverhampton Wanderers were England's representatives in Europe that year, having lifted the major honours ahead of much bigger clubs like Arsenal and Manchester United. Richards referred to the appetite for European football as 'continental fever'. He was keen for the league to re-establish itself: 'We must be prepared to put the interests of the League and the game before individual clubs.' Sixteen clubs opposed the competition's creation, thirty-one approved it. The average attendance across the League Cup was 10,556, just higher than the average gate in the Third Division. The total attendance of the Football League competition had fallen by 4 million from the previous season. Richards is reputed to have told Hardaker that he foresaw 'the League Cup final being held at Wembley, but that it wouldn't be during his lifetime'. The first League Cup final to be held at Wembley was Third Division Queens Park Rangers's win over First Division West Bromwich Albion on 4 March 1967. Richards died in 1968.

The first League Cup was won in 1960–61 by Aston Villa who, at the time, held the overall record for major trophies won in England. The next three finals, however, saw the trophy won by clubs who had never won a major trophy before. One of them, Norwich City, had yet to even play in the First Division, while their opponents Rochdale had played no higher than the Third Division.

The introduction of the League Cup gave the Football League more negotiating power with the FA and UEFA. Hardaker threatened UEFA with a boycott of the UEFA Cup, unless UEFA gave the League Cup winner European qualification. As a result of the negotiating tactics, UEFA provided the League Cup winner with a place in the European competitions, providing the team was in the first division. Tottenham Hotspur were the first team to qualify for Europe by virtue of winning the competition. Although Leeds United had won the competition before Tottenham, Leeds qualified for Europe based on league position. The winners of the 1966–67 and 1968–69 editions, Queen's Park Rangers and Swindon Town did not participate in Europe, as they were not in the First Division.

Prior to the agreement with UEFA, the competition was not considered worthy of the larger clubs' attention. However, once a position in Europe was on offer, as was a final at Wembley Stadium, the competition's standing was improved and in the 1968–69 season only Manchester United declined to participate. Everton chose not to compete in 1970–71 so that they could concentrate their efforts on the European Cup. Entry was made compulsory for all Football League teams the following year.

Liverpool have won the cup on the most occasions with nine victories, and both they and Manchester City have won four League Cups in successive years. Liverpool completed two trebles of trophy wins, in 1983–84 and 2000–01, winning the League Cup in both of these years.

English clubs lost their place in European competitions for an indefinite period in 1985 as a result of the Heysel disaster, where Liverpool fans had taken part in a riot at the European Cup final, resulting in the death of 39 spectators. That year's winners of the League Cup were Norwich City, who would otherwise have played in a European competition for the first time in the 1985–86 season. Oxford United, Arsenal, Luton Town and Nottingham Forest also missed out on the chance to compete in the UEFA Cup as League Cup holders over the next four years. Even when the ban was lifted in 1990, League Cup winners did not participate in European competitions for two more years, when Manchester United won the trophy and qualified for the UEFA Cup anyway, as they had finished second in the league. In the previous two seasons, Nottingham Forest and Sheffield Wednesday had both been prevented from competing in the UEFA Cup as League Cup winners, due to the gradual reintegration of English clubs in European competitions.

In 2016–17, the competition was renamed the EFL Cup as part of the Football League's rebranding to become the English Football League.

Modern changes
In the early 21st century, following restructuring of European football, particularly of its international club competitions, the UEFA Champions League, UEFA Europa Conference League and the UEFA Europa League, there were considerations of removing the prize of European qualification from the League Cup's winners. It has retained its Europa Conference League berth, however, leaving England and France the only UEFA members to offer a European berth to the winners of their second cup competitions until 2020, when Coupe de la Ligue was suspended indefinitely. This has allowed the League Cup to retain popularity, especially with fans of clubs for whom success in cup competitions offers their only realistic chance of qualifying for Europe.

Giant-killings
Giant-killings are less well remembered in the League Cup than in the FA Cup due to the absence of non-league sides and the fact that big clubs often field more inexperienced sides in the early rounds. However, there have been some notable upsets, the final of 1966–67 saw Division Three side Queens Park Rangers come from 2–0 down at half time to win 3–2 against top-flight West Bromwich Albion in the first League Cup Final to be hosted at Wembley Stadium. Two years later in 1968–69, Third Division side Swindon Town beat Arsenal 3–1 after extra time in the final to win the trophy. In 1974–75, Fourth Division side Chester beating defending league champions Leeds United 3–0 on their surprise run to the semi-finals.

Former League club and now defunct Scarborough defeated Chelsea 4–3 on aggregate in October 1989, while a Fourth Division club. In 1992–93, Scarborough then defeated Coventry City (then a top-tier side) 3–2 on aggregate, before ultimately going out of the competition, narrowly, 1–0, against Arsenal.

In 1995–96, Manchester United were beaten 3–0 at home by York City in the second round, first leg; United could only win 3–1 in the second leg and went out 4–3 on aggregate (York went on to repeat the achievement against Everton the following year). United went on to win the FA Premier League and FA Cup double and did not lose another home game that season, while York narrowly avoided relegation to Division Three (fourth tier).

Grimsby Town recorded a number of upsets over a nine year stretch, whilst playing in the third tier in 1996-97 they defeated Premier League side Sheffield Wednesday 4-3 on aggregate over both legs before dumping out fellow top flight side Leicester City 3-1 in the next round. In 2001–02 they beat current holders Liverpool at Anfield with a 2-1 win in extra time. Four years later they recorded another giant killing by defeating Tottenham Hotspur 1-0 at home, by this time Grimsby were playing in the fourth tier.

Manchester United have also been knocked out by Southend United and Coventry City in 2006–07 and 2007–08 respectively: in the match against Southend they fielded a strong side with 10 internationals, bucking a trend they had themselves started during the 1990s. In the 2014–15 season, Manchester United fielded five international players but lost 4–0 in the second round (in which they entered the tournament) against third-tier side MK Dons.

In 2010 Liverpool were humbled again by Northampton Town, one of the lowest placed teams in League Two.  In the 2012–13 competition, League Two (fourth tier) side Bradford City eliminated three Premier League sides from the competition, becoming the lowest-ranked team to do so since Rochdale in 1961–62. However, their luck finally ran out in the final, where they were beaten by Swansea City. In their centenary year, Swansea became the first team from outside England to win the League Cup on 24 February 2013, when they beat Bradford City 5–0 to win their first major English trophy.

In the 2022–23 competition, Gillingham (then ranked 22nd in League Two) eliminated Brentford (then ranked 11th in the Premier League) in the third round on penalties; the teams were 79 places apart in the English football league system.

Format
The League Cup is open to all 92 members of the Premier League and English Football League and is divided into seven rounds, organised so that 32 teams remain by the third round (with the exception of the 1961–62 competition). Since 1996–97, teams involved in European competition during the season have received a bye to the third round; the remaining Premier League teams enter at the second round, and the remaining Football League teams enter at the first round. If the number of byes causes an odd number of teams to enter a round, another team may be given a bye (usually the highest-placed team of those relegated from the Premier League the previous season) or a preliminary round may be played between the two teams promoted from the Football Conference the previous season (or, if only one team is promoted, that team would play against the lowest-placed team not to be relegated from the Football League the previous season); preliminary rounds have only been necessary in the 2002–03 and 2011–12 competitions. Up to 1995–96, all teams were involved by the second round, although some received byes to that stage.

Matches in all rounds are single-legged, except for the semi-finals, which have been two-legged since the competition began. The final was two-legged from 1961 to 1966, but has been single-legged ever since. The first round was two-legged from 1975–76 to 2000–01, and the second round was two-legged from 1979–80 to 2000–01. Single-legged matches would be replayed as necessary until 1993–94, when penalties were introduced to settle the first replay; the last single-legged tie to require a replay was played in 1996–97.

Until 1974–75, two-legged ties that remained level after extra time in the second leg would be replayed; in that time, three ties reached a third replay. Between 1975–76 and 1979–80, ties would still be replayed, but a penalty shoot-out would be used to settle ties that could not be decided after a replay; replays of two-legged matches were finally abolished for 1980–81, with the away goals rule and penalties being adopted instead. The semi-finals were the exception to this, with level ties being replayed until 1986–87, after which the away goals rule and penalties were introduced. The semi-finals, when played over two legs, would apply the away goals rule only after extra time. From 2018–19, extra time was scrapped for all rounds except the final, and the away goal rule was scrapped for the semi-final, with level ties going straight to a penalty shoot-out.

Final

For the first six seasons of the Football League Cup, the final was played over two legs, with each leg being played at the home ground of each finalist. Since 1967, the final has been played as a single match at Wembley Stadium, although the Millennium Stadium in Cardiff was used between 2001 and 2007, following the demolition of the old Wembley. Between 1967 and 1997, finals that finished level after extra time were replayed at an alternative venue until a winner was decided. The only final to require two replays was the 1977 final between Aston Villa and Everton. The venues that hosted replays were Hillsborough Stadium in Sheffield, Old Trafford and Maine Road in Manchester and Villa Park in Birmingham.

Since 1998, finals that have finished level after extra time have been decided by penalty shoot-out. Until 1999–2000, the final was played in late March or early April. Thereafter it has been played in late February or early March.

Since 1989–90, the best player in the League Cup final has been presented with the Alan Hardaker Trophy, named after Alan Hardaker, the former secretary of the Football League who devised the Football League Cup. John Terry, Ben Foster and Vincent Kompany are the only players to win the award more than once.

Results by club

Sponsorship
From 1981 to the present (except in 2016–17), the League Cup has attracted title sponsorship, which meant, unlike its older sibling the FA Cup, the League Cup was named after its sponsor, giving it the following names:

Trophy
The winners receive the EFL Cup, of which there have been three designs – the current one also being the original, a three-handled Georgian-style urn with a separate plinth (added later). Designed and manufactured by Mappin & Webb, it weighs 2.976 kg and measures 27 cm by 20.5 cm. It is worth around £20,000. It was used until the 1980–81 competition, before coming back into use ever since the 1990–91 competition. The reason for the break in usage was the introduction of the first competition sponsor – the Milk Marketing Board, who chose to award their own trophy from 1981–82 to 1985–86. The next sponsor, Littlewoods, also chose to award their own trophy, from 1986–87 until 1989–90. Later sponsors have used the original.

Broadcasters

In the United Kingdom and Republic of Ireland, 15 matches will be broadcast live by Sky Sports through 2024 with highlights from the several matches on ITV Sport beginning in 2022/23. This competition is included in the EFL broadcast package.

Records
:

 Most tournament wins (team): 9 – Liverpool
 Most consecutive tournament wins (team): 4 – Liverpool (1981–1984) and Manchester City (2018–2021)
 Most final appearances (team): 13 – Liverpool
 Most tournament wins (individual): 6
 Sergio Agüero and Fernandinho for Manchester City (2014, 2016, 2018–2021)
 Most final appearances: (individual): 6
 Ian Rush for Liverpool (1981–1984, 1987, 1995)
 Emile Heskey for Leicester City (1997, 1999, 2000), Liverpool (2001, 2003) and Aston Villa (2010)
 Fernandinho for Manchester City (2014, 2016, 2018–2021)
 Most goals scored (individual, career): 49 – Ian Rush
 Most goals scored (individual, season): 12 – Andy Richie, Oldham Athletic (1989–90)
 Most goals scored (individual, match): 6 – Frankie Bunn (Oldham Athletic, vs Scarborough, 25 October 1989)
 Biggest win:
 West Ham United 10–0 Bury, second round, second leg, 25 October 1983
 Liverpool 10–0 Fulham, second round first leg, 23 September 1986
 Biggest aggregate win in a semi-final: Manchester City 10–0 Burton Albion (9–0 home, 1–0 away), 23 January 2019
 Biggest win in a final: Swansea City 5–0 Bradford City, 24 February 2013
 Highest scoring game: Reading 5–7 (a.e.t.) Arsenal, fourth round, 30 October 2012 and Dagenham & Redbridge 6–6 (a.e.t.) Brentford, first round, 12 August 2014
 Most penalties scored in a penalty shoot-out: 27
 Liverpool 14–13 Middlesbrough (23 September 2014)
 Derby County 14–13 Carlisle United (23 August 2016)
 Most penalties attempted in a penalty shoot-out: 32 – Derby County vs Carlisle United (23 August 2016)
 Youngest player: Harvey Elliott – Millwall vs Fulham, 25 September 2018)
 Youngest goalscorer in the final: Norman Whiteside ( (Manchester United vs Liverpool, 1983)
 Youngest captain in the final: Barry Venison,  – Sunderland vs Norwich City, 1985)
 Most replays in a tie: 3
 Tranmere Rovers v. Chester (1968–69, first round): 0–0, 2–2 , 1–1 , 2–1
 Reading v. Brighton & Hove Albion (1974–75, first round): 0–0, 2–2 , 0–0 , 3–2
 Hartlepool v. Bournemouth (1974–75, second round): 1–1, 2–2 , 1–1 , 1–0
 Birmingham City v. Notts County (1983–84, third round): 2–2, 0–0 , 0–0 , 3–1
 Swindon Town v. Bolton Wanderers (1989–90, third round): 3–3, 1–1 , 1–1 , 2–1

References

External links

 

 England League Cup Full Results 1960–1996. Rec.Sport.Soccer Statistics Foundation (RSSSF)
 BBC News and RSSSF for attendance data

 
Cup
2
1960 establishments in England
Recurring sporting events established in 1960